Short Brothers Football Club, often referred to simply as Shorts is a Northern Irish intermediate football club playing in Division 1C of the Northern Amateur Football League. It is connected to the Short Brothers aerospace manufacturing company in Belfast and was formed with the arrival of the company to the city in the 1930s. The club - originally known as Aircraft Works - joined the Amateur League in 1937 and is the second-oldest member club with continual membership.

Honours

Intermediate honours 
 Irish Intermediate Cup: 1
1987–88
 Steel & Sons Cup: 1
1979–80
  Northern Amateur Football League: 5
1956–57, 1957–58, 1958–59, 1959–60, 1989–90
 Clarence Cup: 1
1939–40
Border Cup: 7
1939–40, 1946–47, 1948–49, 1955–56, 1959–60, 1981–82, 1983–84

External links  
 nifootball.co.uk - (For fixtures, results and tables of all Northern Ireland amateur football leagues)

Notes

Association football clubs in Northern Ireland
Association football clubs in Belfast
Northern Amateur Football League clubs
1937 establishments in Northern Ireland
Association football clubs established in 1937
Works association football teams in Northern Ireland